William Greaves (1830 – 6 October 1869) was an Australian cricketer. He played four first-class cricket matches for Victoria between 1863 and 1868.

See also
 List of Victoria first-class cricketers

References

1830 births
1869 deaths
Australian cricketers
Victoria cricketers
Place of birth missing
Melbourne Cricket Club cricketers